Caperton is an unincorporated community and coal town  in Fayette County, West Virginia, United States. It was also known as Elen.

The community has the name of Austin Caperton, a businessman in the local mining industry.

Notable person
 J. Roy Hunt, cinematographer
 Marian McQuade, National Grandparent's Day founder

References 

Unincorporated communities in West Virginia
Unincorporated communities in Fayette County, West Virginia
Coal towns in West Virginia